Steel tariff may refer to:
The 2002 United States steel tariff introduced in 2002 by President George W. Bush
The steel and aluminium tariff proposed on 1 March 2018 by President Donald Trump